Jeff Greinke is an American ambient music and jazz artist and composer currently based in Tucson, Arizona. He is known as one of the pioneers of dark ambient music, with his earlier solo albums often compared to works by Robert Rich, Brian Eno, and Vidna Obmana. Greinke's approach on his ambient works is to heavily layer, multitrack, and texture soundscapes, effectively using the studio as an instrument.

In 1993 Greinke founded the group LAND, described by guitarist Dennis Rea as "an odd blend of jazz, rock, electronic, and world music." LAND released three albums between 1995 and 2001 and also played live extensively, including a 1996 tour of China, Hong Kong, and Macau.

Greinke is also half of the duo Hana with Sky Cries Mary vocalist Anisa Romero. Hana has released two albums to date.

Discography

In LAND
 1995 : LAND (studio album)
 1997 : Archipelago (studio album)
 2001 : Road Movies (studio album)

In Hana
 1999 : Hana (studio album)
 2001 : Omen (studio album)

with Rob Angus
 1984 : Night and Fog (studio album)
 1992 : Crossing Ngoli (studio album)

with Pierre Perret
 1989 : Fragment 1 (studio album)

with Art Zoyd and J.A. Deane
 1990 : Art Zoyd – J.A. Deane – J. Greinke (studio album) 

with Faith & Disease
 2002 : Dream the Red Clouds

Solo albums
 1984 : Before the Storm (studio album)
 1985 : Cities in Fog (studio album)
 1986 : Over Ruins (studio album)
 1987 : Places of Motility (studio album)
 1987 : Moving Climates (studio album)
 1988 : Timbral Planes (studio album)
 1990 : Changing Skies (studio album)
 1992 : Lost Terrain (studio album)
 1993 : In Another Place (studio album)
 1994 : Big Weather (studio album)
 1997 : Cities in Fog 2 (studio album)
 1998 : Swimming (studio album)
 1999 : Ride (studio album)
 2002 : Wide View (studio album)
 2003 : Weather From Another Planet(studio album)
 2004 : Soundtracks (studio album)
 2007 : Winter Light (studio album)
 2009 : Virga (studio album)
 2011 : Cities In Fog 2 (studio album)
 2013 : Scenes From A Train (studio album)
 2018 : Before Sunrise (studio album)
 2021 : Other Weather (studio album)

Notes

External links

  Official website
  Jeff Greinke interview from Chaos Control Digizine (2001)

Ambient musicians
American electronic musicians
Land (band) members
Musicians from Arizona
Living people
Year of birth missing (living people)